Anastasiia Oleksiivna Kamenskykh (born 4 May 1987), known professionally as NK, is a Ukrainian pop and R&B singer, actress, television personality and businesswoman.

Childhood life and education 
NK was born in Kyiv, Ukraine. At the age of five, she took part in educational programs for family exchanges and lived some time in France. At the age of 6, she moved to Italy and lived there for seven years. She continued studying at the Pechersk School International in Kyiv, and at music school. NK graduated from music school at the age of 15 and started taking professional ballet classes. She did ballet for 8 years. She also was a student at the Wisconsin International University in Ukraine.

NK speaks five languages: Ukrainian, Russian, English, Italian, and Spanish.

Music career 
In 2004, NK debuted as a singer at the Black Sea Games festival, where she received a grand prix and won all kinds of awards. One year later she received the UBN Awards at the Opening of the Year nomination in London in 2005.

During 2006-2017, NK performed as part of the duo Potap & Nastya alongside Oleksii Potapenko. The duo became very popular, received multiple awards, and worldwide prominence.

In 2017, she began her solo project NK. That year she debuted her first solo video and song "#etomoyanoch" ["#thatsmytypeofnight"] which went viral in social media. That same year she released a Christmas acoustic album and Christmas video Xmas with NK which featured famous Christmas hits in four languages (English, Italian, Russian, and Ukrainian) as well as original songs written by NK herself. In 2014, Potap and Kamenskih were criticized in Ukraine for continuing to attend award ceremonies in Russia, while Ukraine was under Russian aggression. On this they responded: "It's a shame that we have to collect the journalists to tell that we are from Ukraine and love our country!" In 2016, "Potap and Nastya" concerts were disrupted in Ukraine in protest of them continuing to tour in Russia.

After the release of the first song, each following track by NK achieved multimillion views on YouTube. The next song to be released was “Dai Mne” in March 2018. It was followed by another original "Trymay" ["Hold"] written by NK herself. The song sounded in every leading music chart in Ukraine. Moreover, in September 2018 NK exclusively presented her Ukrainian song "Trymay" on the biggest Italian radio station Radio Rai.

Shortly after, NK released a song written in English and Spanish called "Peligroso". The song was written in collaboration with multiple Latin Grammy Awards winner Yoel Henriquez, Cris Chil (composer) and Potap (composer) and produced by Ali Alvarez. The song was presented at the most popular TV and radio shows in Latin America including ¡Despierta América! on Univision, Total Acceso and Titulares y Más on Telemundo, Centro on WBZ4 and ¡Hola! TV. As part of the "Peligroso" promotional tour, NK also attended the 2018 Latin Recording Academy Person of the Year gala and the 19th Annual Latin Grammy Awards ceremony, becoming the first artist from Ukraine to be invited there. "Peligroso" peaked at number 24 on Billboards Tropical Songs chart and remained there for six weeks. On March 29, 2019, a reggaeton artist De La Ghetto featured in the official remix of "Peligroso". The release was supported with an official music video in which both NK and De La Ghetto took part. The video generated over a million views within the first day of the upload.

On October 12, 2018, NK released her first solo album No Komments and a video for a song "LOMALA". The album includes 10 tracks written in English, Ukrainian and Russian.

In December 2018, NK was nominated for 5 categories at M1 Music Awards becoming the most nominated female artist. There she was awarded with Female Artist of the Year and Best Music Video of the Year. TV Channel Ukraine recognized NK with the Best International Star award too.

On February 14, 2019 NK released an official music video for "Popa Kak U Kim" - one of the most popular songs from the first solo album No Komments. The video went viral right away, making it to #1 Trending video on YouTube with over 2 million views within the first 24 hours. The singer also featured on a cover of Cosmopolitan magazine in Ukraine that month.

The next release by the artist followed on April 25, 2019 with the Ukrainian language song "Обіцяю" ["I Promise"] along with the official music video for it.

On July 8, 2019, NK appeared as a Guest Star the stage of the Palace of Sports for Maluma's very first show in Ukraine.

TV career 

2007 – Dancing with the Stars star participant on 1+1 channel in Ukraine

2008 – a star participant of the TV project on the First channel Two Stars in Russia

2010 – a star participant of the vocal TV project on the 1+1 channel Star + Star in Ukraine

2010 - a TV presenter of the Guten Morgen morning program on M1 music channel in Ukraine

Since 2016 – a TV presenter of the children's version of the program Make a comedian laugh, Children on 1+1 channel in Ukraine

Since 2017 till now - judge and mentor of The X-Factor. In 2018, NK's protégé ZBSband became the winners of the 9th season of the show. They were the first band to win it ever.

2017 – special Christmas movie and acoustic album Xmas with NK

Business career 

In 2017, NK launched her own brand of sportswear, NKsport. The brand has produced 10 separate collections since 2017.

Other 

Since 2015, she has run her own lifestyle video blog NKBLOG on YouTube.

Since 2017, she is a regular participant of the charity program "Charity Weekend". Funds collected from concert programs are transferred to the Institute of Traumatology and Orthopedics of the National Academy of Medical Sciences of Ukraine.

In 2017, NK started cooperating with a charity organization "Giznelub" ["Cheerful Person"]. She actively participates in collecting clothes as well as giving away food for senior citizens on an ongoing basis. By 2018, she was involved in two campaigns. The singer also launched an auction selling personal and concert clothing to collect funds for the same purpose. All the donations are forwarded to open spots were seniors could get free food and clothes daily. In 2018, she helped to open 2 spots of that kind.

In 2018, NK was an honorary friend of the UEFA Women's Champion League 2018.

Music activity in figures

Discography

Studio albums

Potap & Nastya 
 Ne para (2008)
 Ne lubi mne mozgi (2009)
 Vse puchkom (2013)
 Shchit i miach (2015)

NK 
 Xmas with NK (2017)
 No Komments (2018)
 Ecléctica (EP, 2020)
 Красное вино (2021)

Singles

NK 
 2005 — "Kakaya raznitsa"
 2016 — "Abnimos/Dosvidos" (feat. Nadya Dorofeeva)
 2017 — "#etomoyanoch" (#thatsmytypeofnight)
 2018 — "Day mne"
 2018 — "Trymai"
 2018 — "Lomala"
 2018 — "Peligroso"
 2019 — "Popa Kak U Kim"
 2019 — "Obitsiaiu"
 2019 — "Elefante"
 2020 — "Miami" (feat. Jacob Forever & Jessy Frank)
 2020 — "Lollipop" (feat. Juan Magan)
 2020 — "A huevo"
 2020 — "Película"
 2020 — Vibe
 2021 — "Pochuttia"

Potap & Nastya 

 2006 — "Bez lyubvi"
 2007 — "Ne para"
 2007 — "Vnature"
 2007 — "Krepkie oreshki"
 2008 — "Razgulyai"
 2008 — "Na rayone"
 2008 — "Pochemu"
 2009 — "Ne lyubi mne mozgi"
 2010 — "Novyi god"
 2010 — "Cry me a river"
 2010 — "Leto"
 2010 — "Chipsy, chiksy, lavandos (Selo)"
 2010 — "Ty vlip Phillip"
 2011 — "Vykrutasy"

 2011 — "Chumachechaya Vesna"
 2011 — "My otmenyaem K.S"
 2011 — "Esli vdrug"
 2012 — "Prilileto"
 2012 — "Uleleto"
 2013 — "RuRuRu"
 2013 — "Vmeste"
 2013 — "Vsio puchkom"
 2014 — "Udi Udi"
 2015 — "Bumdigigibye"
 2015 — "Stil' sobachki" (feat. Bianka)
 2016 — "Umamy"
 2016 — "Zolotye kity"
 2017 — "Ya...(ya)dovitaya"

Awards

References

External links 
 

1987 births
Living people
Musicians from Kyiv
21st-century Ukrainian women singers
Ukrainian pop singers
Ukrainian television presenters
Ukrainian women television presenters
Russian-language singers of Ukraine
Spanish-language singers of Ukraine
Winners of the Golden Gramophone Award